Hasseröder is a brewery in Wernigerode, Saxony-Anhalt, Germany.

History 

The company started in 1872, founded by Robert Hoppe under the name zum Auerhahn ("the Capercaillie"), in the Wernigerode district of Hasserode. In 1882 Ernst Schreyer assumed control of the brewery. In 1896 the brewery became a stock company (Aktiengesellschaft, AG), and in the same year put out 25,000 hectoliters of beer. It was renamed Hasseröder Brauerei in 1920. The brand remained in existence, when Wernigerode became part of East Germany after World War II, marketed predominantly in the Magdeburg district.

Since reunification, Hasseröder has become the most consumed beer in the new states of Germany. Hasseröder ranks number 6 among Germany's best selling breweries.

Products

 Premium Pilsener: Pilsner style beer 4.9 abv
 Premium Export: Strong Export beer 5.5 abv
 Premium Radler: Mixed drink with Export and Lemonade 2.7 abv
 Premium Diesel: Mixed drink with Export and Cola 2.7 abv

See also

 List of brewing companies in Germany

References

External links
Official Homepage of the Brewery 

Food and drink companies established in 1872
Breweries in Germany
Beer brands of Germany
Buildings and structures in Saxony-Anhalt
Companies based in Saxony-Anhalt